12 Concerti a cinque (op. 9) is a collection of concertos by the Italian composer Tomaso Albinoni, published in 1722.

The most famous piece from Albinoni's Opus 9 is the Concerto in D minor for oboe (Opus 9, Number 2). It is known for its slow movement. This concerto is probably the second best-known work of Albinoni after the Adagio in G minor (which was once believed to be a reconstruction based on a fragment by Albinoni). 

The concertos were dedicated to Maximilian II Emanuel, Elector of Bavaria, and were first published by Michel-Charles Le Cène in Amsterdam.  It is possible, but not certain, that they were written in the Elector's court during a 1722 visit there by Albinoni during performances of his theatrical compositions. These are perhaps his most recognizable works.

The 12 concertos 
 Concerto for violin in B flat major, Op. 9, No. 1 (I. Allegro, II. Adagio, III. Allegro)
 Concerto for oboe in D minor, Op. 9, No. 2 (I. Allegro e non presto, II. Adagio, III. Allegro)
 Concerto for 2 oboes in F major, Op. 9, No. 3  (I. Allegro, II. Adagio, III. Allegro)
 Concerto for violin in A major, Op. 9, No. 4  (I. Allegro, II. Adagio, III. Allegro)
 Concerto for oboe in C major, Op. 9, No. 5  (I. Allegro, II. Adagio, III. Allegro)
 Concerto for 2 oboes in G major, Op. 9, No. 6  (I. Allegro, II. Adagio, III. Allegro)
 Concerto for violin in D major, Op. 9, No. 7 (I. Allegro, II. Andante e sempre piano, III. Allegro)
 Concerto for oboe in G minor, Op. 9, No. 8  (I. Allegro, II. Adagio, III. Allegro)
 Concerto for 2 oboes in C major, Op. 9, No. 9  (I. Allegro, II. Adagio, III. Allegro)
 Concerto for violin in F major, Op. 9, No. 10  (I. Allegro, II. Adagio, III. Allegro)
 Concerto for oboe in B flat major, Op. 9, No. 11 (I. Allegro, II. Adagio, III. Allegro)
 Concerto for 2 oboes in D major, Op. 9, No. 12  (I. Allegro, II. Adagio, III. Allegro)

References

External links 

 12 Concerti a cinque (Albinoni): Scores at the International Music Score Library Project

Compositions by Tomaso Albinoni
1722 works
Albinoni
Albinoni